The bar-winged rail (Hypotaenidia poeciloptera) was a species of bird in the family Rallidae. It was endemic to Fiji and was last collected ca 1890 in Viti Levu. The species was identified from twelve 19th century specimens, some of which are known to be in Boston, London and New York. The last unconfirmed sighting of this bird was in 1973.

Fossil remains dating back to the late Pleistocene or early Holocene are known from some caves in Fiji.

Description 
 
It was a flightless island ground-nesting forest/freshwater swamp dweller and is believed to have disappeared after the introduction of the mongoose and cats to the islands.

References

 University of Wisconsin Reference  Downloaded 22 December 2007.

External links
3D view of specimen RMNH 110.047, RMNH 110.064 and RMNH 110.065 at Naturalis, Leiden (requires QuickTime browser plugin).

bar-winged rail
†
Extinct birds of Oceania
Extinct flightless birds
Bird extinctions since 1500
bar-winged rail
Taxonomy articles created by Polbot